Trapa-Trapa Formation is a volcano-sedimentary formation of Miocene age in south-central Chile and nearby parts of Argentina. The largest outcrops lie in the Andes, while the Chilean Central Valley host some of the smaller outcrops. The volcanic rocks of the formation are of calc-alkaline character, and are less silicic than contemporary volcanic rocks found further north in the Farellones Formation.

References 

Geologic formations of Chile
Geologic formations of Argentina
Miocene Series of South America
Miocene volcanism
Neogene Argentina
Neogene Chile
Tuff formations
Geology of Araucanía Region
Geology of Biobío Region
Geology of Maule Region
Geology of Neuquén Province